David Elliot (born 27 July 1981) is a Scottish actor best known for his roles of John Banks in The Wee Man and as Mark Wright in the film Kajaki in which he was awarded the best actor accolade at the 2015 British Academy Scotland Awards.

Filmography

Television

Film

Theatre

Awards

References

External links
 

1981 births
Living people
Scottish male film actors
Scottish male stage actors
Scottish male television actors
Scottish male voice actors
Male actors from Edinburgh